Inkubus Sukkubus are an English goth and pagan rock band, formed in 1989 by Candia Ridley, Tony McKormack and Adam Henderson, who have been described as one of the most enduringly popular underground Goth bands in the UK. They also have been described by Mick Mercer as a "zombie version of Fleetwood Mac" in his book Hex Files: The Goth Bible.

History
Inkubus Sukkubus have released albums and toured the UK and internationally ever since their formation as Incubus Succubus in 1989.

In 1995, the band adopted the name Inkubus Sukkubus, citing numerology as the reason for the change, and signed to Resurrection Records. The live line-up changed significantly, adopting the use of a drum machine and sequenced backing, with some additional support by a bodhrán, and Adam Henderson moving back to bass.

In 1996, the band appeared live on UK national television on Channel 4's The Big Breakfast, performing the track 'Heartbeat Of The Earth'.

The band have played many of the major European dark alternative festivals including Amphi, M'era Luna, and the Wave-Gotik-Treffen at Leipzig.

In June 2017, the band hosted a weekend event at St Briavels Castle in the Forest of Dean – a celebration of midsummer with storytelling, history, Egyptian dancing, and a handfasting ceremony.

Members
The group currently consists of guitarist Tony McKormack (ex-Screaming Dead), vocalist Candia McKormack and bassist Roland Link. The band uses a drum machine and sequencer to provide percussion and orchestral backing. They also perform as a fully acoustic act with Abigail Blackman on cello, Nick Gibbs on violin, and Marcus Gilvear on drums.

Candia McKormack – vocals, lyrics, bodhrán
Tony McKormack – guitar, keyboards, mandolin, lute, production, songwriting, lyrics, programming, video creation, vocals (ex-Screaming Dead, also in Vampire Division)
Roland Link – bass guitar

In 2013, Candia was the model for a painting called The Sukkubus, by the award winning fantasy artist, Larry Elmore for use in his Kickstarter.

In 2016, Candia was painted by artist Russell Haines for his 'Faith' exhibition, at Gloucester Cathedral. The band also performed at the launch event which the Bishop of Gloucester, Rachel Treweek, attended.

Discography

Albums
1990: Beltaine (independent release) 
1993: Belladonna & Aconite
1994: Wytches
1995: Heartbeat of the Earth
1997: Vampyre Erotica
1998: Away with the Faeries
1999: Wild
2001: Supernature
2003: The Beast with Two Backs
2007: Science & Nature
2008: Viva la Muerte
2010: The Dark Goddess
2011: The Goat
2013: Queen of Heaven, Queen of Hell
2014: Love Poltergeist
2015: Mother Moon
2016: Barrow Wake: Tales of Witchcraft and Wonder, Volume One
2016: Wikka Woman
2017: Belas Knap: Tales of Witchcraft and Wonder, Volume Two
2018: Vampire Queen
2018: Sabrina – Goddess of the Severn: Tales of Witchcraft and Wonder, Volume Three
2019: Lilith Rising
2021: The Way Of The Witch

Compilation albums
1998: Away with the Faeries
2004: Wytches and Vampyres: The Best Of (Greatest Hits compilation released by US record label Cleopatra Records)
2013: The Anthology (Greatest Hits)

Singles and EPs
1991: "Beltaine"
1994: "Corn King"
2005: Witch Queen (EP)
2018: Melancholy Blue limited edition 12" coloured vinyl

Movie soundtracks
2010: The Vampires of Bloody Island

Bibliography
2020: Tales Of Witchcraft And Wonder

See also
Neopagan music

References

External links

 Inkubus Sukkubus at ReverbNation

English hard rock musical groups
Musical groups established in 1989
Modern pagan musical groups
English gothic rock groups
Modern paganism in the United Kingdom
Musicians from Gloucestershire